John Marston (June 12, 1795 – April 7, 1885) was an officer in the United States Navy.

Early career
During the War of 1812, Marston served as a messenger and carried the first news of Commander Isaac Hull's capture of HMS Guerriere to John Adams at Quincy, Massachusetts.  The former president's influence gained him an appointment as midshipman, the warrant being dated April 15, 1813.

Marston saw some service during the War of 1812, and was later aboard USS Constitution when Lord Byron visited the famous frigate. In 1825 Marston was promoted to the grade of lieutenant, and was aboard USS Brandywine when she conveyed Marquis de Lafayette to France. In 1827–29 Marston served in the Pacific squadron, and again in 1833 and 1834.

In 1840 he was assigned to the frigate USS United States, and in the following year was commissioned commander. In 1850 he was assigned to the command USS Yorktown, on the coast of Africa, and he was in charge of the Philadelphia Naval Shipyard from 1853 until 1855, when he was promoted to captain.

Civil War
Although placed on the retired list in December 1861, Marston was assigned to USS Cumberland, of the Brazil squadron, in which service he continued for a year, when he was commissioned commodore, July 16, 1862.  Marston was in command of the frigate USS Roanoke at Hampton Roads when CSS Virginia destroyed USS Congress and USS Cumberland.

Later career
Marston was promoted to rear admiral in March 1881, and for several years after the Civil War, he was in charge of the navy-yards at Portsmouth and Philadelphia, and of the naval station at Key West in 1867. He also acted as a lighthouse inspector, 1863–66. In his many voyages he served under Commodores John Rodgers, Isaac Hull, Matthew C. Perry, and Isaac Chauncey, of the old navy, and had seen altogether, before his retirement, half a century of active service.

Personal life
Marston was a communicant of the Protestant Episcopal church. His oldest son, Matthew R. Marston, entered the regular army, and was brevetted major for gallantry during the siege of Vicksburg.

Marston died on April 17, 1885.  

1795 births
1885 deaths
Union Navy officers
People from Boston
People from Massachusetts in the War of 1812
United States Navy commodores
United States Navy officers
Military personnel from Massachusetts